The West Hill Cliff Railway, or West Hill Lift, is a funicular railway located in the English seaside town of Hastings. It runs largely in tunnel, and provides access to Hastings Castle and St Clement's Caves from George Street, on the town's sea front. The West Hill overlooks the sea to the south, the Old Town to the east, and the current central business district of Hastings to the west.

The line is owned and operated by Hastings Borough Council and has the following technical parameters:

Length: 
Height difference: 
Gradient: 33%
Cars: 2
Capacity: 16 passengers per car
Configuration: Double track
Gauge: 
Traction: Electricity

Construction of the line was started in 1889 by a private operator, the Hastings Lift Company. The line met with local opposition, which meant that the work took longer to complete than originally envisaged, and construction costs were over 50% higher than envisaged. The line finally opened in 1891, and was originally powered by a gas engine.

The first operator went bankrupt in 1894, probably as a result of the construction delays and cost overrun. The Hastings Passenger Lift Company took over and operated the line until 1947, when Hastings Borough Council bought the line. It was converted from a water balanced system to electric operation in 1971. To mark the railway's centenary year, the line was fully refurbished in 1991.

The West Hill Lift is complemented by the East Hill Cliff Lift, giving visitors access to Hastings Country Park.

See also 
 List of funicular railways

References

External links 

Article on Hastings Cliff Railways from The Heritage Trail web site
Article on Hastings Cliff Railways from the Funicular Railways of the UK web site
Article about the 2018 Coastal Currents Art Festival sound installation in the West Hill Cliff Railway

Transport in Hastings
Funicular railways in the United Kingdom
Tourist attractions in East Sussex
6 ft gauge railways in England